Ödön Radvány (27 December 1888 – 20 April 1959) was a Hungarian wrestler. He competed at the 1908, 1912 and the 1924 Summer Olympics.

References

External links
 

1888 births
1959 deaths
Olympic wrestlers of Hungary
Wrestlers at the 1908 Summer Olympics
Wrestlers at the 1912 Summer Olympics
Wrestlers at the 1924 Summer Olympics
Hungarian male sport wrestlers
Martial artists from Budapest
20th-century Hungarian people